Quattro bravi ragazzi ("Four Fine Boys") is a 1993 Italian crime-drama film written and directed by Claudio Camarca.

The film was screened in the Venetian Nights section at the 50th Venice International Film Festival.

Cast 
 
  Matteo Chioatto as René Cordaro
  Patrizio Fumagalli as  Marco
  Riccardo Salerno as  Giorgio Molteni
  Lorenzo Bianchi as  Davide Chiarelli
 Michele Placido as  "Marcione"
 Tony Sperandeo as  Prof. Franchini
 Luigi Maria Burruano as   René's Father
  Giancarlo Dettori as  Giorgio's Father 
 Nicola Pistoia as  Vincenzo Sellani
 Violante Placido as  Valeria

See also      
 List of Italian films of 1993

References

External links

1993 films
Italian crime drama films
1993 crime drama films
1993 directorial debut films
1990s Italian-language films
1990s Italian films